The 2017 TCR International Series Sakhir round was the second round of the 2017 TCR International Series season. It took place on 15–16 April at the Bahrain International Circuit.

Roberto Colciago won the first race starting from third position, driving a Honda Civic Type-R TCR, and Dušan Borković gained the second one, driving an Alfa Romeo Giulietta TCR.

Ballast
Due to the results obtained in the previous round, Davit Kajaia received +30 kg, Attila Tassi +20 kg and Pepe Oriola +10 kg.

A last minute BOP adjustment was announced after qualifying, meaning the Opel Astra TCRs engine power was adjusted down from 100% to 95%. Both the Audi RS3 LMS TCRs and SEAT León TCRs using a DSG gearbox was given -10mm in ride height, running at 70mm from the minimum 80mm in ride height.

Classification

Qualifying

Notes
 — Maťo Homola was sent to the back of the grid for Race 1, after an engine change after FP1.
 — Giacomo Altoè had his best laptime deleted during Q1 and therefore did not qualify for Q2. However, after qualifying, the stewards reversed this decision and Altoès best laptime was reinstated.

Race 1

Race 2

Standings after the event

Drivers' Championship standings

Model of the Year standings

Teams' Championship standings

 Note: Only the top five positions are included for both sets of drivers' standings.

References

External links
TCR International Series official website

Sakhir
TCR International Series
Sakhir TCR